Flight 302 may refer to:
AeroUnion Flight 302, crashed on 13 April 2010
Ethiopian Airlines Flight 302, crashed on 10 March 2019

0302